Gassicourt may refer to:

Gassicourt, a former commune of France, now a part of Mantes-la-Jolie
Louis Claude Cadet de Gassicourt (1731-1799), French chemist